Brandon Miller (born April 8, 1990) is an American singer-songwriter, guitarist. He was part of several cover bands in the Kansas City, Missouri area, would ultimately front the Brandon Miller Band and become a founding member of the Danielle Nicole Band with Danielle Nicole, featured as a lead guitarist and vocalist.

Biography
Miller was born in Gardner, Kansas, United States. After performing vocals and guitars with several local cover bands, Miller formed the Brandon Miller Band to record and promote his solo projects: "Slow Train" and "Brandon Miller Band – Live at Knuckleheads". He then joined with the Danielle Nicole Band, singing and playing on both her albums "Live at The Gospel Lounge" and  her Concord Records Release, "Cry No More".  Miller toured in support of "Cry No More" internationally at venues such as the Fourth Annual Utah Blues Festival June 2018, the International Blues Festival in Canada in July 2018, the Chenago Blues Festival in 2019 and in Lake Tahoe, Nevada. "Cry No More" was nominated for a Grammy Award, would receive the Independent Blues Award for best contemporary CD in Blues Blast Magazine in 2018 and in 2019 garnished three additional Independent Blues Awards. His Live at Knuckleheads Release garnished a nomination for Best Independent Blues Live CD 2019.

Miller performed with many other blues artists such as Monster Mike Welch and Mike Ledbetter and participated in the tribute and fundraiser to Ledbetter after his death. The Brandon Miller Band between 2017 and 2019 opened for blues artist Walter Trout at both Knuckleheads, where Eric Gales was also on the bill, and in Omaha, Nebraska, among other venues.

Virtue And Vice, since its release in 2020, has been reviewed by both in Blues Blast Magazine and Blues Rock Review, where the release was considered for an award as a top blues album of 2020.

As tour dates in support of Virtue and Vice began, including a performance at The Bitter End in New York City, Miller was featured in the Lake Champlain Weekly, "All About The Guitar".

Brandon Miller received the Readers Choice Award by Kansas City Magazine for best musician of 2022

Discography
Last Goodbye - Brandon Miller Band (2011) 
Slow Train – Brandon Miller Band (2014)
Live at Knuckleheads – Brandon Miller Band (2017)
Live at The Gospel Lounge – Danielle Nicole Band (2017)
Cry No More – Danielle Nicole (2018)
Virtue and Vice – Brandon Miller (2020)

References

External links
Official Website https://brandonmillerkc.com/

1990 births
Living people
 Musicians from Kansas
21st-century American male singers
21st-century American singers
 American male songwriters